The Peugeot 3008 is a compact crossover SUV manufactured and marketed by Peugeot. It was first presented to the public in Dubrovnik, Croatia in 2008, and then again in 2010 at the Mondial de l'Automobile in Paris, by the French manufacturer Peugeot. It was launched in April 2009 as the successor to the Peugeot 4007 and Peugeot 4008, and it fills a gap in Peugeot's model lineup between the Peugeot 308, with which it shares its platform, and the Peugeot 5008, its larger counterpart. The second-generation model was unveiled in May 2016, with the vehicle being available as of January 2017.

As of its first generation, the Peugeot 3008 was developed with the Peugeot 5008.



First generation (T84; 2008)

Launched in 2008, the 3008 shares its platform and bears similarity with the Peugeot 5008, which is a three-row MPV and larger counterpart of 3008. Despite having had its styling criticised, the 3008 has been praised by automobile magazines. In January 2010, the British motoring magazine What Car? awarded it Car of the Year for 2010. It also was awarded 2010 Semperit Irish Car of the Year in Ireland. The 3008 followed up this award in 2018, by winning the Continental Irish Car of the Year.

The Exclusive and Allure models have a head up display, which projects a reading onto a small perspex like screen just in front of the main windscreen area in front of the driver. It also contains a distance alert, which warns the driver if he or she is too close to the car in front. It also displays details for cruise control or the speed limiter.

Hybrid version

The Peugeot 3008 HYbrid4 was launched in February 2012, and is the world's first mass production diesel electric hybrid, which used the 6-speed automatic transmission. It included the only 2.0-litre DW10 diesel engine in the PSA line-up.

The crossover hybrid has four different operating modes: Auto (the electronics automatically control the entire system), ZEV (all electric), four wheel drive mode (4WD) and sport (higher engine speeds than normal mode). A 200v nickel-metal hydride (Ni/MH) battery pack is located in the rear.

Engines

Global version 
Pre-facelift styling

Facelift styling

Chinese version
From 2011 to late 2012, the 3008 is imported from Europe to China.

Pre-facelift styling
From late 2012, Dongfeng Peugeot-Citroën Automobile starts manufacturing the 3008. The Chinese model is longer (4.43m) than the global model and has a different design.

Facelift styling

In April 2016, the Chinese 3008 got a facelift, which resulted in a more aggressive design.

Safety

Second generation (P84; 2016)

The second generation 3008 was announced by Peugeot in May 2016, and was first presented to the public at the Paris Motor Show in September 2016. Its design allows the vehicle to come into contention with large competitors in the C segment market of SUVs, which has been a prominent market in the past years. Sales of the second generation 3008 began with the model year of 2017, at the end of 2016.

It features Peugeot's new iCockpit, which is an improved design compared to the current iCockpit featured in the Peugeot 208, Peugeot 2008 and Peugeot 308. The second generation was introduced on 23 May 2016. Features include an eight inch touch screen to the centre console, a 12.3 inch customisable heads up display, and the small style steering wheel, which has become standard in all current models of Peugeot.

Production started in 2016, with sales starting in January 2017. 100,000 orders were made in Europe between October 2016 and March 2017, half of them were made by people who did not own a Peugeot.

2020 facelift 
A facelift was unveiled on 1 September 2020 for the 2021 model year. Featuring new front end styling, resembling that of the New 208 and New 508, increased technology, refreshed interior with an enlarged touchscreen and revised rear lighting.

Hybrid
In February 2023, Peugeot launched the 3008 Hybrid, with the mild hybrid technology reducing fuel consumption by up to 15% compared to the petrol equivalent.

Awards 
In November 2016, the new 3008 was awarded overall CarBuyer "Car of the Year" 2017, as well as winning best in the category of SUVs.

Diesel Car Magazine awarded the 3008 the overall award of Car of the Year for 2017, as well as taking the honour of Best Medium SUV.

In March 2017, the new 3008 won European Car of the Year 2017, by a jury of 58 motoring journalists from twenty two European countries. The award came the same day that the PSA Group announced a $2.3 billion deal to buy GM's Opel division. Opel's Astra won the Car of the Year in 2016, reacted with these two awards within two years, the Peugeot Group CEO Jean-Philippe Imparato said, "This is an alliance of winners".
 European Car of the Year 2017
 CarBuyer Car of the Year 2017
 DieselCar Magazine Car of the Year 2017
 DieselCar Magazine Best Medium SUV 2017

Sales

Notes

References

External links

Official website (United Kingdom)

3008
Cars introduced in 2009
Compact sport utility vehicles
Euro NCAP small family cars
2010s cars
Plug-in hybrid vehicles